Cabo Touriñán is a small peninsula that is the most westerly point of Peninsular Spain. It is located in the municipality of Muxía, which is itself located within the province of A Coruña and the autonomous community of Galicia.  The Cape, along with the rest of Muxía, is best known as a destination for pilgrims who extend the Camino de Santiago by walking to the Atlantic coast after reaching the holy city of Santiago de Compostela.

Description 
The cape is a small peninsula that juts about 1 km into the sea, the narrowest section being an isthmus 150 metres wide between the coasts of Balal and Cuño. Its maximum altitude is 93 metres above sea level. The rock is made of is granite, the erosion of which has caused the formation of deposits of pebbles, known as coídos, and stony bars, which formed an islet such as the so-called A Ínsua on the west side of the cape. The western point of the cape, Os Buxeirados, has a series of rocks that go into the sea around 300 to 400 m, known as A Laxe de Buxeirados or Bajos de Buxeirados. The rocks have proved dangerous for navigation, causing some serious shipwrecks.

Its rugged landscape causes the cape to have vegetation to be basically just thorny reed or gorse like Ulex eruopaeus. In the north of the cape, there is a lighthouse and complementary buildings that were established 15 December 1898.

Name 
The name comes from the nearby parish of Touriñán, in which the cape is located, and that must go back to the Latin name, which is supposed to be "Taurinius" or "Taurinianus" through the genitive "Tauriniani".

Gallery

See also
Cape Finisterre
Extreme points of Spain
Touriñán Lighthouse

References

Tourinan
Geography of the Province of A Coruña
Extreme points of Spain